Davani may refer to:

 Davani (surname)
 Davani, a dress worn by south Indian girls
 Davani dialect, an Iranian dialect or language spoken in southern Iran